Phlebogaster is a genus of truffle-like fungi in the family Claustulaceae. Circumscribed in 1980 by mycologist Robert Fogel, the genus contains two species found in the Canary Islands and Asia.

References

Phallales